Matthew Carpenter may refer to:

Matthew H. Carpenter (1824–1881), U.S. senator from Wisconsin
Matt Carpenter (runner) (born 1964), American ultramarathoner
Matt Carpenter (baseball) (born 1985), American baseball infielder

See also
 Mad Carpentier, a fashion design house of the 1940s and 1950s
 Carpenter (surname)